United States Postal Service v. Hustler Magazine, Inc. is a court case decided in 1986 by the U.S. District Court for the District of Columbia. The court ruled that Hustler could not be stopped from delivering its magazine to members of Congress, upholding Hustler's right to petition the government.

Background 
At some point between 1974 and 1983, Hustler began mailing the latest monthly issue of the magazine to all of the offices of Members of the United States Congress. Attempts by the US Postal Service to block the monthly mailings proved unsuccessful after a court ruled in Hustler's favor in United States Postal Service v. Hustler Magazine, Inc. (1986), contending that the publishers had the right to mail the magazine, as the defendants did not “threaten the unique privacy interests that attach in the home.” As of April 2014, the practice persists.

References

External links
 Hustler on the Hill
 FCC document

United States District Court for the District of Columbia cases
1986 in United States case law